The yellow-striped poison frog (Dendrobates truncatus) is a species of frog in the family Dendrobatidae. It is endemic to Colombia.
Its natural habitats are subtropical or tropical dry forests, subtropical or tropical moist lowland forests, subtropical or tropical moist montane forests, intermittent freshwater marshes, and plantations.

References

Dendrobates
Amphibians of Colombia
Amphibians described in 1861
Taxonomy articles created by Polbot